Vaccinium darrowii, with the common names Darrow's blueberry, evergreen blueberry, scrub blueberry, or southern highbush blueberry, is a species of Vaccinium in the blueberry group (Vaccinium sect. Cyanococcus).

Distribution
Vaccinium darrowii is native to the Southeastern United States, in Alabama, Florida, Georgia, Louisiana, and Mississippi. The primary habitat for the species is pine forests, where it prefers full sun and the slightly acidic soils common in such habitat.

Description

The flowers are white, bell-shaped, 4–8 mm long. The fruit is a berry 4–6 mm diameter, blue-black with a whitish waxy bloom.

Cultivation
The species  Vaccinium darrowii is grown both for its edible berries, and for horticultural uses as an ornamental plant in home gardens, native plant and wildlife gardens, and natural landscaping projects.

Hybrid cultivars
Many commercial Southern Highbush Blueberry cultivars are hybrids, derived from crosses between Vaccinium darrowii with the Northern Highbush Blueberry (Vaccinium corymbosum), as well as other species such as Rabbiteye blueberry (Vaccinium virgatum) and ''Lowbush blueberry (Vaccinium angustifolium).

Southern Highbush Cultivars, in addition to lower chilling requirements, also have greater tolerance to high summer temperatures, somewhat greater drought tolerance and develop superior fruit quality under Southern U.S. growing conditions. As a rule, Southern highbush blueberries are self-fertile. However, larger and earlier-ripening berries result if several cultivars are interplanted for cross-pollination.

The following Southern Highbush Blueberry cultivars, listed by fruit ripening time, are recommended for the fruit garden and landscape: 
Very early season: 'O’Neal'
Early/midseason: 'Cape Fear'
Midseason: 'Blue Ridge' and 'Georgia Gem' (adapted to the Sandhills and Coastal Plains; needs frost protection in the Piedmont)
Mid/late season: 'Legacy' and 'Summit'
Late season: 'Ozarkblue' (Piedmont only)

See also
Vaccinium
Huckleberry

References

External links

photo of herbarium specimen at Missouri Botanical Garden, collected n Florida in 1966

darrowii
Blueberries
Flora of the Southeastern United States
Fruits originating in North America
Crops originating from North America
Plants described in 1878
Bird food plants
Garden plants of North America